The Safa Stadium is a multi-use stadium in Beirut, Lebanon. It is currently used mostly for football matches and serves as the home for Safa SC Beirut. The stadium has a capacity of 4,000 people.

External links
 Frank Jasperneite page

References

Football venues in Beirut
Sports venues in Lebanon